Joaquín Arias Blanco (born 12 November 1914, date of death unknown)  was a Cuban footballer.

Nicknamed Bolero, Arias represented Cuba at the 1938 FIFA World Cup in France. He played three matches.

References

External links
 

1914 births
Year of death missing
Association football midfielders
Cuban footballers
Cuba international footballers
1938 FIFA World Cup players